Chenkulam Dam is a dam located on the Mudirapuzha River in Vellathooval Panchayat of Idukki district of the Indian state of Kerala. It hosts a 48 MW power plant.

History 
The project was commissioned in 1954 with a capacity of 48 MW (4 x 12 MW). The dam was constructed in 1957 as part of the Chenkulam Hydroelectric Project. In 2002, the project was upgraded from 48 MW to 51.2 MW.

Project 
The Chenkulam Project was intended to use the tailrace water of the Pallivasal project. The dam is constructed of masonry. The power house is situated at Vellathooval, Devikulam Taluk. The water collected is conveyed through a penstock pipe to the Chenkulam powerhouse in Vellathooval, which generates 51.2  MW of electricity using 4 12 MW turbines. Annual production is 182 MU. Taluks receiving release flow are Udumpanchola, Devikulam, Idukki, Kothamangalam, Muvattupuzha, Kunnathunadu, Aluva, Kodungalloor and Paravur.

Reservoirs 
Chenkulam reservoir formed behind the dam. The catchment area of the reservoir is approximately 5.18 sqkm.  The tailrace discharge joins Mudirapuzha river and flows downstream to Kallarkutty Reservoir.

Specifications
 Release from dam to river: Sengulam Ar
 Classification: MH (Medium Height)
 Maximum Water Level (MWL): EL 849.49 m
 Full Reservoir Level (FRL): EL 847.65 m
 Storage at FRL: 0.71 Mm3
 Height from deepest foundation : 26.84 m
 Length : 143.26 m

References

Dams in Kerala